Lois Eleanor Delander (February 14, 1911 – January 23, 1985) was Miss America in 1927.

Biography
Delander, a native of Joliet, Illinois and high school junior, aged 16, won the Miss America crown on her parents' twentieth wedding anniversary.  The pageant was not held again until 1933.

She was one of the most famous models appearing in the Gerlach Barklow Co. art calendars. A pastel of Lois Delander wearing a white bathing suit was artist Adelaide Hiebel's most famous work.

Personal life
She married Ralph Lang, a stockbroker, and lived in Evanston, Illinois with her three daughters, Diana, Linda, and Marsha. She died near Chicago in 1985.

References 

Russell Roberts, Richard Youmans : Down the Jersey Shore, Rutgers University Press, 1993 , p. 89

External links 
 A pastel of Lois Delander wearing a white bathing suit, by Adelaide Hiebel

1911 births
1985 deaths
Miss America 1920s delegates
Miss America winners
People from Joliet, Illinois
20th-century American people